The 2006–07 Uruguayan Primera División season was the 104th season of the top division of football in Uruguay.

Overview
It was contested by 16 teams, and Danubio won both the Apertura and Clausura championships.

Apertura

Clausura

Clausura tiebreaker
Since Danubio and Peñarol ended up tied in points for first place, an additional match was played by both teams to decide the Torneo Clausura winners.

Danubio qualified to championship playoff as Clausura winners.

Aggregate table

Championship playoff
No championship playoff matches were needed as Danubio won both Apretura and Clausura.

Relegation playoff 

Progreso won 5–0 on aggregate and stayed in the top division. 

Rocha were relegated along Cerro and Rentistas.

Liguilla

References
Uruguay - List of final tables (RSSSF)

Uruguayan Primera División seasons
2006–07 domestic association football leagues
2006–07 in Uruguayan football
Uru
Uru